The Great Rocks Line is a freight railway line in Derbyshire, England, that runs between the Hope Valley Line at Chapel Milton and the stone quarries and sidings at Peak Dale and Peak Forest, before looping around to the town of Buxton. It takes its name from the Great Rocks Dale through which it runs.

It was opened in 1867 as an extension to the Manchester, Buxton, Matlock and Midland Junction Railway, allowing the passenger trains of the Midland Railway a connection the whole way from London to Manchester for the first time. However, the rest of the former MBM&MJR was closed in June 1968 by the Labour Minister for Transport, Barbara Castle, leaving the northern section now known as the Great Rocks Line open only for stone freight trains and as an emergency diversionary route for the passenger Buxton line.

The most notable structure on the line is the bifurcated Chapel Milton Viaduct, just below the junction with the main line between Sheffield and Manchester. It also passes through the -long Dove Holes Tunnel and the former Chapel-en-le-Frith Central and Peak Forest stations. Both the viaduct and tunnel were designed by the Midland's Engineer-in-Chief, William Henry Barlow, known for designing the train shed at St Pancras at around the same time.

See also
 Buxton lime industry

References

Midland Railway
Rail transport in Derbyshire
Railway lines in the East Midlands